Chtaura is a town in Lebanon in the fertile Beqaa valley located between the Mount Lebanon and Syria. It is located halfway on the Beirut - Damascus highway.

Chtaura is the valley's hub for banking, transportation, and commerce, with many hotels and restaurants on the main road. From Chtaura, travelers can depart for Zahlé, Baalbek, or Damascus.

History
On January 29, 1983, the Israeli-run Front for the Liberation of Lebanon from Foreigners  detonated a car bomb close to the Fatah HQ at Chtaura (also named Shtura), and another in West Beirut, close to the HQ of the left-wing Mourabitoun. Some sixty people were killed and hundreds wounded.

For almost 30 years, during the civil war, the Syrian Army’s military headquarters for the Beqaa Valley was in Chtaura. On 24 November 1989, following the assassination of President René Moawad, his successor, Elias Hrawi, was elected by a hastily gathered assembly of 53 MPs in the Chtaura’s Park Hotel.

Climate 
The area east of Lebanon is known for its dryness. It rarely rains in Chtaura in the summer, and there is a lack of humidity. The summers are  warm, with temperatures reaching 36 degrees Celsius. In winter there are an average of 3-4 snowstorms yearly.

Population 
Chtaura's population has steadily grown since its founding. A century ago, Chtaura had less than two- thousand inhabitants and 70 houses. In the early 20th Century the Ottomans developed Chtaura to be the cultural Hub of the Beqaa Valley due to its strategic location, and the population jumped to about 10,000-15,000 people. The population continued to grow throughout the twentieth century, and today the town is home to about 60–80,000 Lebanese.

References

External links
 Chtaura, Localiban 
  

Populated places in Zahlé District